Lost Files or The Lost Files may refer to:

 Lost Files (YoungBoy Never Broke Again album), 2022
 The Lost Files (Digital Underground album), 1999
 The Lost Files (Donell Jones album), 2009
 The Lost Files (Torchwood), a series of radio dramas based on Torchwood, a British science fiction television series
 Lost Files, a 2006 album by Hiroki Kikuta
 Lost Files,  a 2021 EP by Ken Carson
 "Lost Files", a song by Polo G from his 2019 album Die a Legend